Gošović is a Serbian surname. It is found in Montenegro and Serbia. The Gošović families belong to the Krivodoljani brotherhood of Old Kuči. It may refer to:

Stracimir Gošović, author
Radmila Gošović, Vesna Gošović, authors
Vukić Gošović-Komski, Miroslav Đurović, Stefanija Gošović, authors
Petar Gošović, Montenegrin volleyball player
Danijela Gošović, Montenegrin volleyball player

Serbian surnames